Ordish is a surname. Notable people with the surname include:

 Frederick Webster Ordish (1821–1885), English architect
 Rowland Mason Ordish (1824–1886), English engineer
 T. Fairman Ordish (1855–1924), British folklorist

Other uses
 Ordish-Lefeuvre system, a cable-stayed bridge design